Priceless is the fourth studio album by American singer Kelly Price. It was released by Def Soul on April 29, 2003 in the United States. The album peaked at number 2 on the US Billboard Top R&B/Hip-Hop Albums, and number 10 on the Billboard 200. It marked Price's final release with Def Soul. The song "Again" featured Brazilian influenced acoustic guitar from Eric Clapton.

Critical reception

AllMusic editor Rob Theakston found that the album "is almost as good as her 1997 debut. Priceless reads from track to track almost like an autobiography of Price's life but Priceless is not without its faults, either. There are moments of self-indulgence that hinder Priceless from being great instead of "just good." Unnecessary skits about expensive cars and borrowing the melody of The Brady Bunch theme song just seem unoriginal and downright wrong. That aside, Priceless is a solid album and a much-needed return of a quality R&B vocalist in a genre over-saturated with mediocrity." Soren Baker from Entertainment Weekly felt that "on her third album, [Price] delivers a rousing set filled with more fire than a Judge Judy tirade. Tackling relationship highs ("He Proposed") and lows ("How Does It Feel") with equal vigor, she demonstrates her immense vocal talent."

Chart performance
Priceless debuted and peaked at number ten on the US Billboard 200 with first week sales of 69,000 copies. This marked Price's third consecutive non-Christmas-themed studio album to reach the top ten. Priceless also became her third album to reach the top three on Billboard Top R&B/Hip-Hop Albums, peaking at number two.

Track listing 

Sample credits
 "Introlude (The Pricey Bunch)" contains an interpolation of "The Brady Bunch Theme Song" as written by Frank DeVol and Sherwood Schwartz.
 "Back in the Day" contains excerpts from "Joy and Pain" as performed by Frankie Beverly and Maze.
Notes
 signifies additional producer(s)

Charts

Weekly charts

Year-end charts

References 

2003 albums
Kelly Price albums
Albums produced by Jimmy Jam and Terry Lewis
Albums produced by Raphael Saadiq
Albums produced by Warryn Campbell
Def Jam Recordings albums